Blackshear is a surname first found in Devon. Notable people with the surname include:

Colin Blackshear (born 1979), American filmmaker and multi-media artist
David Blackshear (1764–1837), American general
Jeff Blackshear (born 1969), former American football guard
Kathleen Blackshear (1897–1988), American artist
 Kerry Blackshear Jr. (born 1997), American basketball player in the Israeli Basketball Premier League
Raheem Blackshear (born 1999), American football player
Rodney Blackshear (born 1969), former American arena football wide receiver
Ronald Blackshear (born 1978), former American professional basketball player
Thomas Blackshear (born 1955), African-American artist
Wayne Blackshear (born 1992), American professional basketball player